Rokitansky is a surname. Notable people with the surname include:

Carl von Rokitansky (1804–1878), Bohemian physician, pathologist, humanist philosopher and liberal politician
Hans von Rokitansky (1835–1909), Austrian operatic bass who sang for three decades

See also
Rokitansky–Aschoff sinuses, pseudodiverticula or pockets in the wall of the gallbladder
Mayer Rokitansky Kuster Hauser syndrome, congenital malformation characterized by a failure of the Müllerian duct to develop
Rokitansky nodule, mass or lump in an ovarian teratomatous cyst
Rokitansky-Cushing ulcer, gastric ulcer associated with elevated intracranial pressure